Tank Battalions of the Bundeswehr 1956–2008

Territory Defense Units

Semi-active battalions (Home Defence Forces)

Non-active units (reserves)

Remaining units 

2 tank divisions (Panzerdivisionen) with a total of:
3 tank brigades (Panzerbrigaden)
4 tank battalions (Panzerbataillone)

 Panzerlehrbataillon 93, Munster, part of Panzerlehrbrigade 9
 Panzerbataillon 104, Pfreimd, part of Panzerbrigade 12
 Panzerbataillon 203, Augustdorf, part of Panzerbrigade 21
 Panzerbataillon 393, Bad Salzungen, part of Panzergrenadierbrigade 37

Others 
This list does not include the Panzerjäger (tank destroyer units), at last 39 independent and the companies to assigned brigades of the main combat forces, equipped with Kanonenjagdpanzer and Raketenjagdpanzer Jaguar 1 / Jaguar 2. As well the tank destroyer units of the Home Defence Forces altogether 12 independent companies, equipped with Kanonenjagdpanzer and MBT M48 (90mm gun).

Sources 
Military Balance 1982/83, International Institute for Strategic Studies, London
Tanks of the World. F.M. von Senger und Etterlin. Arms and Armor Press, London, 1983.

External links 

 Homepage der Bundeswehr
 Homepage der Territorialen Wehrverwaltung
 Homepage des Verteidigungsministeriums
 Chronik der Gründung der Bundeswehr
 Die Bundeswehr in Wandel

Armoured units and formations of Germany
Battalions of the Bundeswehr
Lists of military units and formations of Germany
German Army